Labradford is a U.S. post-rock musical group from Richmond, Virginia, founded in 1992. They have released six full albums from 1993 to 2001. Though not disbanded, its members have since been active with separate projects.

Biography
Founded in 1991, Labradford consists of bassist Robert Donne, guitarist/vocalist Mark Nelson, and keyboardist Carter Brown. Their music style is experimental ambient and post-rock, although their first releases were much more related to dark drone rock.

After a début single in 1992, they were signed by Kranky (which has remained their home since) who issued their début album Prazision LP in 1993. The group's music mostly drifts on the guitar effects and the keyboard passages, with the vocals, when present, in the background.

In 1999, they started a tour with Godspeed You! Black Emperor and their Festival of Drifting series, which featured appearances from Pole, Robin Guthrie, Matmos, Papa M, and Sigur Rós.

Though the group has not officially disbanded, they have not released another album since 2001's critically acclaimed Fixed::Context, and the band members have apparently moved away from their former base of Richmond, Virginia. Robert Donne has joined the slow-core group Spokane, and is currently joining Gregor Samsa for their European tour. Mark Nelson continues to release records on Kranky under the name Pan American.

Discography

Full albums
 1993: Prazision LP
 1995: A Stable Reference
 1996: Labradford
 1997: Mi Media Naranja
 1999: E Luxo So
 2001: Fixed::Context

Other releases
 1992: "Everlast", U.S. 7", Retro 8 (now collected on Prazision LP: A-side since the 1993 CD, B-side since its 2007 remaster)
 1995: "Julius", U.S. 7", Merge
 1996: "Scenic Recovery", UK 10", Duophonic
 1996: The Kahanek Incident, Vol. 3, U.S. 12" (split with Stars of the Lid), Trance Syndicate
 2000: Ene, 10" LP split with Surfers of Romantica, Eerie Materials

Compilation appearances
 1992: Repugnating The Wombat US CS Retro 8
 1994: Dixie Flatline (Wilson Interrupt Mix), Skyliner (live) US CD Radioactive Rat
 1994: Ambient 4: Isolationism Air Lubricated Free Axis Trainer UK 2CD Virgin AMBT 4
 1994: The Church Song (remix of a Jim O'Rourke track) US CD Astralwerks ASW6153
 1995: Excursions In Ambience IV: The Fourth Frontier
 1996: Newman Passage, Pico / Elec. Security UK CD Blast First bffp141cde
 1996: Volume 16, The Window UK CD Volume 16 VCD16
 1996: Monsters, Rugrats and Bugmen, Sedr 77 UK 2CD Virgin ambt111
 1998: The Wire Tapper 2 [given away free with The Wire issue 177, November 1998] V (Harold Budd Remix) UK CD WIRECD002
 1999: Drifing A.F.U. [limited edition CD given away free at Labradford's Second Festival of Drifting, 1999]
 2000: The Wire Tapper 5 [given away free with The Wire issue 193, March 2000] So Remix (Matmos Remix), UK CD WIRECD005
 2016: By Chris Johnston, Craig Markva, Jamie Evans (Original Version), The Young Pope Soundtrack, WB CD 5054197508028

See also
 List of ambient music artists
 Pan American, solo project of band member Mark Nelson

References

External links
 Labradford at Brainwashed (official website)
 Labradford at Kranky
 

Music of Richmond, Virginia
American ambient music groups
American experimental rock groups
American post-rock groups
Blast First artists
Trance Syndicate artists
Drone music groups
Musical groups from Virginia